Cremastocheilini is a tribe of scarab beetles in the family Scarabaeidae. There are over 40 genera in Cremastocheilini.

Genera
Subtribe Aspilina
Aspilus Schaum, 1848
Protochilus Krikken, 1976
Subtribe Coenochilina
Arielina Rossi, 1958
Astoxenus Péringuey, 1907
Basilewskynia Schein, 1957
Coenochilus Schaum, 1841
Ruterielina Rojkoff, 2010
Subtribe Cremastocheilina
Centrochilus Krikken, 1976
Clinterocera Motschulsky, 1857
Cremastocheilus Knoch, 1801
Cyclidiellus Krikken, 1976
Cyclidinus Westwood, 1874
Cyclidius MacLeay, 1838
Genuchinus Westwood, 1874
Lissomelas Bates, 1889
Paracyclidius Howden, 1971
Platysodes Westwood, 1873
Psilocnemis Burmeister, 1842
Subtribe Cymophorina
Cymophorus Kirby, 1827
Myrmecochilus Wasmann, 1900
Rhagopteryx Burmeister, 1842
Subtribe Genuchina
Genuchus Kirby, 1825
Meurguesia Ruter, 1969
Problerhinus Deyrolle, 1864
Subtribe Goliathopsidina
Goliathopsis Janson, 1881
Subtribe Heterogeniina
Heterogenius Moser, 1911
Subtribe Lissogeniina
Chtonobius Burmeister, 1847
Lissogenius Schaum, 1844
Subtribe Macromina
Brachymacroma Kraatz, 1896
Campsiura Hope, 1831
Macromina Westwood, 1874
Pseudopilinurgus Moser, 1918
Subtribe Nyassinina
Nyassinus Westwood, 1879
Subtribe Oplostomatina
Anatonochilus Péringuey, 1907
Laurentiana Ruter, 1952
Oplostomus W.S. MacLeay, 1838
Placodidus Péringuey, 1900
Scaptobius Schaum, 1841
Subtribe Pilinurgina
Callynomes Mohnike, 1873
Centrognathus Guérin-Méneville, 1840
Parapilinurgus Arrow, 1910
Pilinurgus Burmeister, 1842
Subtribe Spilophorina
Spilophorus Schaum, 1848
Subtribe Telochilina
Telochilus Krikken, 1975
Subtribe Trichoplina
Lecanoderus Kolbe, 1908
Trichoplus Burmeister, 1842
Subtribe Trogodina
Pseudoscaptobius Krikken, 1976
Trogodes Westwood, 1873

References

Further reading

 Arnett, R. H. Jr., M. C. Thomas, P. E. Skelley and J. H. Frank. (eds.). (21 June 2002). American Beetles, Volume II: Polyphaga: Scarabaeoidea through Curculionoidea. CRC Press LLC, Boca Raton, Florida .
 
 Richard E. White. (1983). Peterson Field Guides: Beetles. Houghton Mifflin Company.

Cetoniinae